The 2010 Canada Masters (also known as the 2010 Rogers Cup presented by National Bank and the 2010 Rogers Cup for sponsorship reasons) was a tennis tournament played on outdoor hard courts in Canada. It was the 121st edition of the Canada Masters for the men (the 109th edition for the women), and was part of the ATP Masters Series of the 2010 ATP World Tour, and of the Premier Series of the 2010 WTA Tour. The men's event was held at the Rexall Centre in Toronto, Canada, from August 7 through August 15, 2010. The women's event was held at the Uniprix Stadium in Montreal, Canada, from August 13 through August 23, 2010. It was scheduled to end August 22 but some of the matches were postponed to August 23 due to rain.

Finals

Men's singles

 Andy Murray defeated  Roger Federer, 7–5, 7–5
It was Murray's first title of the year and 15th of his career. It was his second consecutive win at the event, the first repeat Canadian Masters winner since Andre Agassi in 1994–1995.
Federer rose to world no. 2 upon reaching the final.

Women's singles

 Caroline Wozniacki defeated  Vera Zvonareva, 6–3, 6–2
It was Wozniacki's 3rd title of the year and 9th of her career. It was her first Premier 5 title.

Men's doubles

 Bob Bryan /  Mike Bryan defeated  Julien Benneteau /  Michaël Llodra, 7–5, 6–3 
 This win was the Bryan's sixteenth Masters Series win, for their careers.
 Also, this was the third time they won the Canadian Masters in their careers.

Women's doubles

 Gisela Dulko /  Flavia Pennetta defeated  Květa Peschke /  Katarina Srebotnik, 7–5, 3–6, [12–10]

ATP entrants

Seeds

 Seedings are based on the rankings of August 2, 2010 and is subject to change.

Other entrants
The following players received wildcards into the singles main draw:
  Frank Dancevic
  Pierre-Ludovic Duclos
  Peter Polansky
  Milos Raonic

The following player received special exempt into the singles main draw:
  Xavier Malisse

The following players received entry from the qualifying draw:

  Kevin Anderson
  Denis Istomin
  Lu Yen-hsun
  Fabio Fognini
  Illya Marchenko
  Jarkko Nieminen
  Michael Russell

The following players received the lucky loser spots:
  Somdev Devvarman
  Paul-Henri Mathieu

Notable withdrawals
  Juan Martín del Potro (wrist injury)
  Juan Carlos Ferrero (knee Injury)
  Fernando González (calf)
  Lleyton Hewitt (calf strain)
  John Isner (shoulder injury)
  Ivan Ljubičić
  Juan Mónaco (wrist injury)
  Albert Montañés
  Andy Roddick (glandular fever)
  Jo-Wilfried Tsonga (knee Injury)

WTA entrants

Seeds

 These seedings are ranking of August 9, 2010

Other entrants
The following players received wildcards into the singles main draw
  Stéphanie Dubois
  Virginie Razzano
  Valérie Tétreault
  Aleksandra Wozniak

The following players received entry from the qualifying draw:
  Iveta Benešová
  Heidi El Tabakh
  Jarmila Groth
  Lucie Hradecká
  Vania King
  Ekaterina Makarova
  Bethanie Mattek-Sands
  Monica Niculescu

The following players received the lucky loser spots:
  Kimiko Date-Krumm
  Patty Schnyder

Notable withdrawals
  Justine Henin (elbow injury)
  Maria Sharapova (left foot injury)
  Samantha Stosur (shoulder injury)
  Serena Williams (foot surgery)
  Venus Williams (left knee injury)

References

External links
Official website

 
2010 ATP World Tour
2010 WTA Tour
2010
August 2010 sports events in Canada